Andrew Freshwater (born 31 May 1973) is a British former alpine skier who competed in the 1998 Winter Olympics. Freshwater, along with his brother Duncan, both played shinty for Kincraig.

References

1973 births
Living people
Scottish male alpine skiers
Olympic alpine skiers of Great Britain
Alpine skiers at the 1998 Winter Olympics
Shinty players
Place of birth missing (living people)